Mariel is a municipality and town in the Artemisa Province of Cuba.

Geography
The town is situated on the south-east side of the Mariel Bay. The villages of La Boca, Henequen, Mojica, Quiebra Hacha, and Cabañas are the major settlements composing the municipality of Mariel.

History
Agustín Parlá Orduña, born in Key West on October 11, 1887, of Cuban parents exiled during the struggle for Cuban's independence, was the first man to fly  over the sea from Key West, Florida to El Mariel, Cuba, on May 19, 1913.

The port of Mariel is the nearest port to the United States. In 1980, some 125,000 Cubans left Mariel and went to the United States in what is known as the Mariel boatlift. While many reached the US, several died while traveling through the ocean. Those involved became known as "Marielitos".

Demographics
In 2004, the municipality of Mariel had a population of 42,504.

Transport

Overview
On the east side of the bay are a port, cement works and a power station, which contribute to very high levels of environmental contamination. On the west side of the bay is a former submarine base, later designated as a free trade zone.

New Port of Mariel Development Project

Following an agreement reached in 2009 between the governments of Brazil and Cuba, the Brazilian engineering firm Grupo Odebrecht built a new port, including a major container terminal, in partnership with the Cuban company 
"Zona de Desarrollo Integral de Mariel", a subsidiary of the Cuban military controlled Almacenes Universal S.A. 
This project received an agreement from the Brazilian government to subsidize it up to US$800 million, out of which $300 million would have been already appropriated.

Various Cuban and international media (such as Reuters) report the future Port of Mariel would be designed to have an initial  of berth length, enabling it to receive simultaneously two large ocean vessels. Plans through 2022 call for Mariel to house logistics facilities for offshore oil exploration and development, a new container terminal, general cargo, bulk and refrigerated handling and storage facilities as well as a Special Economic Development Zone for light manufacturing and storage. The Mariel container terminal would have an annual capacity of 850,000 to 1 million containers, compared with Havana's 350,000. These developments should enable Mariel to accommodate the very large container ships which will transit from Asia through the Panama Canal once the enlargement of the latter is completed in the summer of 2014.

Early June 2011 it was announced that the contract for the operation of the future new Port of Mariel container terminal had been awarded by the Cuban government to PSA International, a leading global Singaporean port operator. Earlier on, it had been reported that the Emirati operator DP World (Dubai Ports World) was the leading contender for this contract.

Mariel is ideally situated to handle U.S. cargoes when the American trade embargo is eventually lifted, and will receive U.S. food exports already flowing into the country under a 2000 amendment to the US sanctions. If these technical and political developments occur, and if the Mariel container terminal are operationally and financially competitive, Mariel could become one of the major hub ports of the Caribbean region, competing against the existing hub ports of Freeport, Bahamas; Kingston, Jamaica; Multimodal Caucedo Port, Dominican Republic; Port of Spain, Trinidad and Tobago; and Panama, which receive very large container ships with cargo containers originating or bound to multiple regional origins and destinations, including US ports.

The President of Cuba, Raul Castro, already made two visits to the Mariel development zone to inspect the progress of the works, including one visit in June 2011 together with the former Brazilian President Luiz Inacio Lula da Silva under whom the agreement to support the development of Mariel had been reached.

The new port, with improved highway, railroad, and communications infrastructure, began operating in January 2014.  As of August 2014, the special economic zone was still under construction.

Notable people
Mariel Hemingway was named after this town.

See also

Mariel boatlift
Mariel Municipal Museum
Autopista Havana–Mariel
Municipalities of Cuba
List of cities in Cuba

References

External links
 

Populated places in Artemisa Province
Port cities and towns in Cuba